The Anglican dioceses of Nakuru are the Anglican presence in and around Nakuru, west-central, north-east and south-central Kenya; they are part of the Anglican Church of Kenya. The remaining dioceses of the Church area in the areas of Mombasa, of Maseno, and of Mount Kenya.

Diocese of Nakuru

Nakuru diocese was founded in 1960 from the Diocese of Mombasa, and has since been split twice: to create the Diocese of Eldoret in 1983 and Nyahururu in 1998. It now includes the missionary area of Baringo, which has a suffragan bishop. The Cathedral of the Good Shepherd lies in Nakuru town.

Bishops of Nakuru
1961–1975: Neville Langford-Smith (retired)
1976–1980: Manasses Kuria (became Archbishop)
1980–?: Ladan Kamau
1990–2011: Stephen Mwangi
2004–2008: Ole Sapit, Bishop of Kericho (became first bishop of that diocese)
2012–present: Joseph Muchai
2010–?: Peter Arok, Bishop of Twic East (separatist "missionary bishop" to South Sudan)
Musa Kamuren, Bishop of Baringo

Diocese of Eldoret

The Diocese of Eldoret was erected from Nakuru diocese in January 1983, and has since been split twice: to create Kitale in 1997 and Kapsabet in 2015.

Bishops of Eldoret
5 June 19831990: Alexander Muge
12 January 19921997: Stephen Kewasis (became first Bishop of Kitale)
1997–2010: Thomas Kogo
9 January 2011present: Christopher Ruto

Diocese of Kitale

The Diocese of Kitale was erected from Eldoret diocese on 1 July 1997. Since 2017, Lodwar missionary area, geographically within Kitale diocese, has been under the care of a missionary bishop, suffragan to the Bishop of All Saints, the Primate of All Kenya.

Bishops of Kitale
1997–2018: Stephen Kewasis (previously Bishop of Eldoret)
2017–present: Samson Tuliapus, assistant Bishop of Kapenguria
2018–present Emmanuel Chemengich

Diocese of Nyahururu

Created from Nakuru diocese on 1 January 1998, the Diocese of Nyahururu has since been split once: to create the Maralal missionary area (now diocese) in 2009.

Bishops of Nyahururu
1998–2013: Charles Gaikia
Jacob Lesuuda, Bishop of Maralal
2013–present: Stephen Kabora

Diocese of Kericho

In 2008, Kericho diocese was erected from an area of Nakuru diocese for which Sapit had been responsible as suffragan since 2004. The area had previously been the Narok missionary area of Nakuru diocese.

Bishops of Kericho
1 May 20082016: Ole Sapit (elected Primate of Kenya)
2016–present: Ernest Ng'eno

Diocese of Maralal

The Diocese was founded in 2015; it had become a missionary area in 2009, before which it was part of Nyahururu diocese. As a missionary area, it was under the care of Lesuuda (since 1 March 2009) as a suffragan of the Primate.

Bishops of Maralal
3 October 2015present: Jacob Lesuuda

Lodwar Missionary Area
Cleti Ogeto has been the suffragan bishop of All Saints' Diocese for the Lodwar Missionary Area — the Bishop of Lodwar — since before 2010. The territory now in the missionary area was previously of Kitale diocese.

Baringo Missionary Area
Musa Kamuren was consecrated a suffragan bishop of Nakuru diocese in 2015. He serves as Bishop of Baringo, which missionary area was and is part of the Diocese of Nakuru.

Diocese of Kapsabet

The Diocese of Kapsabet was erected on 1 January 2016 from Eldoret diocese. Its pro-cathedral is St Barnabas, Kapsabet.

Bishops of Kapsabet
12 June 2016present: Paul Korir

References

 
Anglicanism in Kenya
Religion in the British Empire
History of Kenya
Anglican dioceses established in the 20th century
Anglican dioceses established in the 21st century

1961 establishments in Kenya
1983 establishments in Kenya
1997 establishments in Kenya
1998 establishments in Kenya
2008 establishments in Kenya
2015 establishments in Kenya
2016 establishments in Kenya